Lira 512 (also known as Lira XT) was an IBM PC XT compatible computer made by the Yugoslav (now Serbian) company EI Niš in the late 1980s. It was first presented to the public in April 1988 at the “Kompjuter ‘88” computer show in Belgrade. Soon after that, Lira 512 was also presented in Yugoslav computer press.

What separates Lira 512 from most of the other XT compatibles is that keyboard is included just above in the same case (together with the 3.5’’ floppy drive), which made it similar in appearance to the original Atari ST or the Amiga 500. Lira has two display adapters (monochrome Hercules compatible and color CGA compatible), where the active video adapter is chosen by the back-panel switch. A 40W power adapter is also installed in the same case.

The main purpose of Lira 512 was to be used in computer classrooms.

Specifications
 CPU: Intel 8088 running at 4.77 MHz or 10 MHz (turbo)
 ROM: 8 KB Award BIOS, expandable to 32KB
 RAM: 512 KB (expandable up to 640 KB)
 Operating system: MS DOS 3.21
 Secondary storage: 3.5’’ Panasonic floppy drive 720KB
 Display: two display adapters (only one can be used at a time)
Hercules compatible adapter (monochrome 80x25 text or graphic 720x348)
CGA compatible adapter (color text 40x25, 80x25 or graphic 320x200, 640x200)
 Sound: beeper
 I/O ports: composite, RF and DE9 RGB video output, RS-232 (DB25 male + DE9 male connector reserved for the mouse), parallel port (DB25 female connector), external floppy connector, DA15 PC joystick female connector, light pen and expansion connector
 Power supply 40W

Lira 512 gallery

Other Lira models

Lira XT Tower  
Lira XT Tower was released about a year after the release of the original Lira 512, because it was realized that 512's compact case limits hardware expansion. To address this issue, especially to allow for the installation of the hard disk, the case was changed to a slimline tower.

Lira AT  
About the same time with Lira XT Tower, the new Lira AT was released with similar looking slimline tower case. Lira AT was compatible with IBM PC AT and it was equipped with Intel 80286 CPU, 1MB of RAM, EGA compatible video adapter, 2x3.5" floppy drives and 40MB hard disk.
Serial production of Lira AT started in December 1989.

Lira 386  
In 1990 the design of the Lira 386 (based on Intel 80386 CPU) was ready for production.

References 

IBM PC compatibles